The title of High Steward or Great Steward is that of an officer who controls the domestic affairs of a royal household. In the 12th century King David I of Scotland gave the title to Walter fitz Alan, a nobleman from Brittany, whose descendants adopted the surname "Steward", later "Stewart" and later founded the royal House of Stewart. A junior branch of the Stewart family descended from the younger son of Alexander Stewart, 4th High Steward of Scotland (d.1283), namely "Stewart of Darnley", paternal ancestors of King James I & VI, lived for several generations in France, when the name became spelt in the French manner "Stuart" and "Dernelé". In 1371 Robert Stewart, 7th High Steward of Scotland inherited the throne of Scotland via his mother and became King Robert II of Scotland, when the title or office of High Steward of Scotland merged into the crown. However it was re-granted by the monarch to his elder son and heir apparent, together with the titles Duke of Rothesay (created 1398), Baron of Renfrew (created 1404), Earl of Carrick (created 1186) and Lord of the Isles (created c. 875). Thus, currently, the Prince of Wales is High Steward of Scotland, sometimes known as the Prince and Great Steward of Scotland.

High Stewards of Scotland, c. 1150–present
Walter Fitz-Alan, 1st High Steward of Scotland c. 1150–1177
Alan Fitzwalter, 2nd High Steward of Scotland 1177–1204
Walter Stewart, 3rd High Steward of Scotland 1204–1246
Alexander Stewart, 4th High Steward of Scotland 1246–1283
James Stewart, 5th High Steward of Scotland 1283–1309
Walter Stewart, 6th High Steward of Scotland 1309–1327
Robert Stewart, 7th High Steward of Scotland (Robert II of Scotland) 1327–1371
John Stewart, 8th High Steward of Scotland (Robert III of Scotland) c. 1371–1390
David Stewart, Duke of Rothesay 1398–1402
James Stewart, Duke of Rothesay (James I of Scotland) 1402–1406
Alexander Stewart, Duke of Rothesay 1430
James Stewart, Duke of Rothesay (James II of Scotland) 1430–1437
James Stewart, Duke of Rothesay (James III of Scotland) 1453–1460
James Stewart, Duke of Rothesay (James IV of Scotland) 1473–1488
James Stewart, Duke of Rothesay 1507–1508
Arthur Stewart, Duke of Rothesay 1509–1510
James Stewart, Duke of Rothesay (James V of Scotland) 1512–1513
James Stewart, Duke of Rothesay 1540–1541
James Stuart, Duke of Rothesay (James VI & I) 1566–1567
Henry Frederick Stuart, Duke of Rothesay (Prince of Wales) 1594–1612
Charles Stuart, Duke of Rothesay (Charles I) 1612–1625
Charles Stuart, Duke of Rothesay (Charles II) 1630–1649
James Francis Edward Stuart, Duke of Rothesay 1688–1689
George Augustus, Duke of Rothesay (George II) 1714–1727
Frederick Louis, Duke of Rothesay (Prince of Wales) 1727–1751
George, Duke of Rothesay (George IV) 1762–1820
Albert Edward, Duke of Rothesay (Edward VII) 1841–1901
George, Duke of Rothesay (George V) 1901–1910
Edward, Duke of Rothesay (Edward VIII) 1910–1936
Charles, Duke of Rothesay (Charles III) 1952–2022
William, Duke of Rothesay 2022–

References

Constitution of the United Kingdom
Political office-holders in Scotland
Lists of office-holders in Scotland
Positions within the British Royal Household
Ceremonial officers in the United Kingdom
Scotland, High Steward of
High Stewards of Scotland